The Changes is a Chicago rock band formed in March 2002.

Their music has been described as filtering in the new wave end of rock, with its dreamy jangle and jazzy rhythms. The band's members are Darren Spitzer (vocals/guitar/keys), Rob Kallick (bass guitar/keys), David Rothblatt (lead guitar/keys/vocals) and Jonny Basofin (drums and bells/keys). Their debut album Today Is Tonight was released on September 26, 2006, on Drama Club Records in the United States and Kitchenware Records in Europe.  They released a 7" double A-side single of "Her You and I" and "Such A Scene" in the UK on Kitchenware Records on May 28, 2007. After performing as the only unsigned band at Lollapalooza tour in 2005, The Changes officially signed with an independent record label soon after.

The Changes have also played with The Futureheads, Ted Leo and the Pharmacists, Stephen Malkmus, Metric, The Walkmen, Office, Elefant, Kaiser Chiefs, The 1900s, The Thrills, The Cinematics, The Spinto Band and Tally Hall.

Discography

Singles & EPs
 First of May, 2003 
 The Changes, 2005
 Florida, 2007
 Her You and I / Such a Scene, 7", Kitchenware Records, 2007
 When I Wake / No One Needs To Know, 7", Kitchenware Records, 2007

Albums

 Today Is Tonight, Drama Club Records, 2006. Today Is Tonight is the debut album from American rock band The Changes. 
Track listing
"When I Wake" – 3:15
"On a String" – 3:41
"Water of the Gods" – 2:22
"Sisters" – 4:06
"House of Style" – 3:24
"Modern Love" – 3:31
"Twilight" – 4:15
"The Machine" – 3:37
"Such a Scene" – 2:45
"In the Dark" – 3:38
"Her, You and I" – 6:15
"When I Sleep" – 3:25
 American Master, 2013
"A Mystery" 
"Bones"
"No One Wants to Be Alone"
"Mask"
"Logan Square"
"I Woke Up"
"Gas Station Girl"
"It Was Saturday"
"In My Mind"
"Stays In Your Heart"
"Never Blue"

References

 The Changes are done with day jobs in Chicago-and ready to rock the Super Bowl - Chicago Tribune
 The Changes: Today Is Tonight | Album Reviews | Pitchfork
 The Changes: Adventurous and Well-Crafted : World Cafe : NPR
 The Changes | SPIN | Profiles | Spotlight

External links
The Changes MySpace

American new wave musical groups
Musical groups established in 2002
Musical groups from Chicago
2002 establishments in Illinois